Nerskogen may refer to:

Places
Nerskogen, Finnmark, a village in Alta municipality in Finnmark county, Norway 
Nerskogen, Trøndelag, a village in Rennebu municipality in Trøndelag county, Norway
Nerskogen Chapel, a church in Rennebu municipality in Trøndelag county, Norway